Nelson Richard DeMille (born August 23, 1943) is an American author of action adventure and suspense novels. His novels include Plum Island, The Charm School, and The Gold Coast. DeMille has also written under the pen names Jack Cannon, Kurt Ladner, Ellen Kay and Brad Matthews.

Biography 
DeMille was born in New York City on August 23, 1943. He moved as a child with his family to Long Island. He attended Elmont Memorial High School where he played football and ran track.

After spending three years at Hofstra University, he joined the Army and attended Officer Candidate School. He was a First Lieutenant in the United States Army (1966–69) and saw action as an infantry platoon leader with the First Cavalry Division in Vietnam. He was decorated with the Air Medal, Bronze Star, and the Vietnamese Cross of Gallantry, and was awarded the Combat Infantryman Badge.

DeMille returned to the States and went back to Hofstra University, where he received his degree in political science and history. He has three children, Lauren, Alexander, and James. He resides in Garden City, New York.

DeMille’s earlier books were NYPD detective novels. His first major novel was By the Rivers of Babylon, published in 1978 and still in print, as are all his succeeding novels. He is a member of American Mensa, the Authors Guild, and past president of the Mystery Writers of America. He is also a member of the International Thriller Writers, who honored him as 2015 ThrillerMaster of the Year. DeMille holds three honorary doctorates: Doctor of Humane Letters from Hofstra University, Doctor of Literature from Long Island University, and Doctor of Humane Letters from Dowling College.

DeMille is the author of By the Rivers of Babylon, Cathedral, The Talbot Odyssey, Word of Honor, The Charm School, The Gold Coast, The General’s Daughter, Spencerville, Plum Island, The Lion’s Game, Up Country, Night Fall, Wild Fire, The Gate House, The Lion, The Panther,  The Quest, Radiant Angel, and The Cuban Affair. He also co-authored Mayday with Thomas Block and The Deserter with his son, Alex DeMille, and has contributed short stories, book reviews, and articles to magazines and newspapers both online and in print.

Writing style 

Many of DeMille's books are written in the first person, and as such his books follow a linear plotline in which the reader moves along with the main character.

Although the tone of his writing varies from novel to novel, one consistent tool is DeMille's liberal use of sarcasm and dry humor.

Most DeMille novels, especially the more recent, avoid "Hollywood endings," and instead finish either inconclusively or with the hero successfully exposing the secret/solving the mystery while suffering in his career or personal life as a result. There are generally loose ends left for the reader to puzzle over, Night Fall being a perfect example.

Works 
DeMille often uses Long Island, where he currently lives,  as a setting in his novels, as in The Gold Coast, The Gate House, Plum Island, Word of Honor, Night Fall, and Radiant Angel. His most recent novels have followed two main characters, John Corey (starring in seven novels) and Paul Brenner (starring in two novels, with also a part in Corey's sixth novel). In earlier works, the storylines were completely separate, but there have been hints in the novels that they are part of a larger "DeMille Universe" that references events and characters in earlier novels, such as The Gold Coast and The Charm School.

DeMille spends approximately 16 months creating each of his novels due to the extensive research involved, and because he writes them longhand on legal pads with a number one pencil.

Bibliography

John Sutter series 
The Gold Coast (1990)
The Gate House (2008)

Characters 

John Sutter, Susan Sutter, Felix Mancuso, and several other characters of The Gold Coast reappear in the sequel The Gate House.

Paul Brenner series 
The General's Daughter (1992)
Up Country (2002)
The Panther (2012), Paul Brenner teams up with John Corey on a case.

Characters 
Paul Brenner, a criminal investigator/ Special Agent for the United States Army's Criminal Investigation Division (CID). He was introduced in The General's Daughter and reappears in Up Country, and The Panther.  He now works as a Special Agent for the US State Department's Diplomatic Security Service (DSS).  His girlfriend is US Army CID investigator/ Special Agent Cynthia Sunhill.

Colonel Karl Hellman is Brenner's superior officer at the CID. He appeared in The General's Daughter and Up Country.

John Corey series 
Plum Island (1997)
The Lion's Game (2000)
Night Fall (2004)
Wild Fire (2006)
The Lion (2010), direct sequel to The Lion's Game
The Panther (2012), John Corey teams up with Paul Brenner on a case.
Radiant Angel (2015)
The Maze (2022)

Characters 
John Corey, a former homicide detective, medically retired from the NYPD with 3 gunshot wounds, now working for the FBI’s Anti-Terrorist Task Force. He was introduced in Plum Island and reappears in The Lion's Game, Night Fall, Wild Fire, The Lion, The Panther, and Radiant Angel.
Kate Mayfield, an F.B.I. special agent. Introduced in The Lion's Game. She marries Corey and reappears in Night Fall, Wild Fire, The Lion, The Panther, and Radiant Angel.
Asad Khalil, a Libyan terrorist. His family was wiped out in an American military attack in 1986, for which he swore revenge.
Ted Nash, a CIA agent and arch-rival of Corey, who is introduced in Plum Island and reappears in The Lion's Game, Night Fall, and Wild Fire.

Joe Ryker series 
The Sniper (1974)
The Hammer of God (1974)
The Agent of Death (1975)
The Smack Man (1975)
The Cannibal (1975)
The Night of the Phoenix (1975)

Characters 
NYPD Sergeant Joe Ryker, a tired, no-nonsense detective assigned to the NYPD Detective Bureau, whose natural understanding of his environment gives him an enhanced instinct for tracking down criminals.  A loner, he carries two weapons: a standard police snub-nosed .38 Special revolver in an ankle holster, and a .357 Magnum revolver carried in a shoulder-holster.  He appeared in the first six novels by DeMille. All were republished in 1989 bearing DeMille's nom-de-plume "Jack Cannon".

Stand-alone novels 
1. The Quest (1975, re-released 2013 )
2. By the Rivers of Babylon (1978)
3. Cathedral (1981)
4. The Talbot Odyssey (1984)
5. Word of Honor (1985)
6. The Charm School (1988)
7. Spencerville (1994)
8. Mayday (1998)
9. The Cuban Affair (2017)
10. The Deserter (2019)

Characters 
Colonel Petr Burov/Boris/Boris Korsakov: Though not explicitly stated, DeMille hints that Burov, the antagonist in The Charm School, is the same person as the mysterious "Boris," a character in The Lion's Game and The Lion who trained Asad Khalil.

Short fiction 
The Mystery at Thorn Mansion (1976)
Life or Breath (1976)
"Revenge and Rebellion", in The Plot Thickens, (1997)
The Rich and the Dead (2011)
The Book Case (2011)
Death Benefits (2012)
Rendezvous (2012)

Other novels 
Hitler's Children: The True Story of Nazi Human Stud Farms (1976)  (as Kurt Ladner)
Killer Sharks: The Real Story (1977)  (as Brad Mathews)

Non-fiction 
The Five-Million-Dollar Woman: Barbara Walters (1976) (as Ellen Kay)

Contributed works 
The Plot Thickens (1997)
Getting Your Book Published for Dummies (2000)
Takeoff! (2000)
The Best American Mystery Stories (2004)
Dangerous Women (2005)
The Book that Changed my Life (2007)
In the Shadow of the Master: Classic Tales by Edgar Allan Poe (2009)
The Rich and the Dead (2011)
The Book Case (2011)
Long Island’s Gold Coast (2012)
OHEKA Castle (2012)
Death Benefits (2012)
Rendezvous (2012)
The Mystery Writers of America Cookbook (2015)
The Books that Changed My Life (2016)
Great Minds Think and Write: 50 Years of the Mensa Bulletin (2016)
The Artists’ and Writers’ Cookbook: A Collection of Stories and Recipes (2016)
MatchUp (2017)

Filmography

References

External links 

The "official" DeMille webpage
Nelson DeMille Bibliography
Military.com article on Nelson DeMille
BlogTalkRadio interview with Rodger Nichols Jan 24, 2018 - The Cuban Affair

1943 births
Living people
People from Garden City, New York
People from Jamaica, Queens
Hofstra University alumni
American thriller writers
American crime fiction writers
United States Army personnel of the Vietnam War
Mensans
20th-century American novelists
21st-century American novelists
People from Elmont, New York
American male novelists
United States Army officers
20th-century American male writers
21st-century American male writers